Ateliér duše is the seventh solo album by Marika Gombitová released on OPUS in 1987.

Track listing

Official releases

 1987: Ateliér duše, LP, MC, OPUS, #9313 1915
 1996: Ateliér duše, CD, re-release, Open Music, #0050 2331
 1996: Ateliér duše, 2 bonus tracks (SP "Mami, mami"), CD, OPUS, #91 2561 
 2004: Ateliér duše: Komplet 7, 4 bonus tracks (EP Slávnosť úprimných slov), CD, OPUS, #91 2561

Credits and personnel

 Marika Gombitová - lead vocal, writer
 Václav Patejdl - writer, piano, keyboards, LinnDrum computer, chorus
 Kamil Peteraj - lyrics
 Karel Gott - lead vocal
 Juraj Burian - electric and acoustic guitar
 Andrej Šeban - electric guitar
 Michal Důžek - bass, chorus

 Peter Penthor - chorus
 Trend band - chorus
 Štefan Danko - responsible editor
 Peter Smolinský - producer
 Juraj Filo - sound director
 Jozef Krajčovič - sound director
 Ivan Minárik - technical coordination
 Fedor Nemec - photography

Charts

Weekly charts

Year-end charts

Awards

POPulár
POPulár was a Slovak music magazine that mapped the domestic and international music scene, maintaining also POP awards. The magazine was published monthly since 1970, until its termination in 1992 (Note: In July 2008, the magazine was restored by Nový Populár, issued twice a month). Gombitová won four times as the Best Female Singer (1983, 1986, 1987-8), and once she received the Best Album award (1987).

Mladé rozlety
Mladé rozlety, established by the poet Ivan Štrpka was a color magazine intended for teenagers and the youth. After two sampler issues, the periodical was released weekly since January 1987, and in the 90's renamed as M-Report. Apart from music polls, the magazine also organized a national contest of Slovak amateur bands. Gombitová won one poll (1988).

Notes
E  Mladé rozlety was also the name of a Slovak punk group (formed in May 1988 as one of the first of its kind in the country).

Video release

A video release of the album on VHS, also entitled Ateliér duše, followed the album in 1987, as the first video-cassette ever released by a Czechoslovak artist.

Track listing

Credits and personnel

 Marika Gombitová - lead vocal, writer
 Václav Patejdl - writer
 Ján Lauko
 Kamil Peteraj - lyrics

 Ladislav Kaboš - director
 Juraj Lihosit - director
 Filmové ateliéry Koliba - studio

References

General

Specific

External links 
 
 

1987 albums
1987 video albums
Marika Gombitová albums
Pop albums by Slovak artists
Marika Gombitová video albums